Peer Eugen Georg Schmidt (11 March 1926; Erfurt, Weimar Germany – 8 May 2010; Berlin) was a German actor who specialized in films, television and dubbing. He is best known as the German voice of Gérard Philipe, Marlon Brando and Jean-Paul Belmondo.

Selected filmography

References

External links 

1926 births
2010 deaths
Actors from Erfurt
German male film actors
German male stage actors
German male television actors
German male voice actors
20th-century German male actors